The Bogota fruit-eating bat (Dermanura bogotensis) is a species of bat found in South America.

Taxonomy and etymology
This bat was described in 1906 by Danish mammalogist Knud Andersen. He described it as a subspecies of the Gervais's fruit-eating bat, A. cinereus. The holotype had been collected near Bogotá, Colombia, undoubtedly inspiring the species name "bogotensis." Later, beginning in 1987, the taxon was considered a subspecies of the silver fruit-eating bat, D. glauca. In 2008, researchers proposed that the Bogota fruit-eating bat should be elevated to species rank.

Description
It has pale brown fur and distinct white stripes on its face. It lacks a tail. It weighs .

Biology and ecology
This bat is frugivorous. It is bimodally polyestrous, meaning that it has two breeding seasons in a year. These breeding seasons correspond to seasonal fruit abundance. Like many bat species, it is nocturnal, roosting in sheltered places during the day such as caves.

Range and habitat
It has been documented in several countries in South America, including Colombia, Guyana, Peru, Suriname, and Venezuela. It is often found in montane forests.

Conservation
It is currently evaluated as least concern by the IUCN. Major threats to this species, if any exist, have not been identified.

References

External links
Image of this species 

Dermanura
Bats of South America
Mammals of Colombia
Endemic fauna of Colombia
Altiplano Cundiboyacense
Mammals described in 1906
Taxa named by Knud Andersen